Stanley Richard Hunt (August 18, 1929 – January 4, 2006) was an American newspaper cartoonist.

Born in Williston Park, New York, Hunt served in the Korean War with the 1st Infantry Division of the U.S. Army. After the war, Hunt attended the New York School of Art. He created cartoons for various newspapers, including the New York World-Telegram and St. Petersburg Times. He was with The Pilot in North Carolina shortly before his death at age 76.

He was an editorial and sports cartoonist for The Springfield Union and The Charlotte Observer. Later he moved on to Myrtle Beach, South Carolina to work on golf magazines.

Awards
Hunt was nominated for the Pulitzer Prize for Cartooning.

External links
Answers.com
AF News

1929 births
2006 deaths
American comic strip cartoonists
American comics artists
American columnists
The New Yorker cartoonists
People from Williston Park, New York
United States Army soldiers
United States Army personnel of the Korean War